The 1999 All-Big Ten Conference football team consists of American football players chosen as All-Big Ten Conference players for the 1999 NCAA Division I-A football season.  The conference recognizes two official All-Big Ten selectors: (1) the Big Ten conference coaches selected separate offensive and defensive units and named first- and second-team players (the "Coaches" team); and (2) a panel of sports writers and broadcasters covering the Big Ten also selected offensive and defensive units and named first- and second-team players (the "Media" team).

Offensive selections

Quarterbacks
 Drew Brees, Purdue (Coaches-1; Media-1)
 Antwaan Randle El, Indiana (Coaches-2; Media-2)

Running backs
 Ron Dayne, Wisconsin (Coaches-1; Media-1)
 Thomas Hamner, Minnesota (Coaches-1; Media-1)
 Anthony Thomas, Michigan (Coaches-2; Media-2)
 Ladell Betts, Iowa (Coaches-2)
 Damien Anderson, Northwestern (Media-2)

Receivers
 Plaxico Burress, Michigan State (Coaches-1; Media-1)
 David Terrell, Michigan (Coaches-1; Media-2)
 Chris Daniels, Purdue (Coaches-2; Media-1)
 Chafie Fields, Penn State (Coaches-2)
 Marcus Knight, Michigan (Media-2)

Centers
 Ben Hamilton, Minnesota (Coaches-1; Media-2)
 Casey Rabach, Wisconsin (Coaches-2; Media-1)

Guards
 Bill Ferrario, Wisconsin (Coaches-1; Media-1)
 Steve Hutchinson, Michigan (Coaches-1; Media-1)
 Shaun Mason, Michigan State (Coaches-2; Media-2)
 Ray Redziniak, Illinois (Coaches-2)
 Eric Cole, Penn State (Media-2)

Tackles
 Chris McIntosh, Wisconsin (Coaches-1; Media-1)
 Kareem McKenzie, Penn State (Coaches-1; Media-2)
 Jeff Backus, Michigan (Coaches-2; Media-1)
 Marques Sullivan, Illinois (Coaches-2)
 Matt Light, Purdue (Media-2)

Tight ends
 Tim Stratton, Purdue (Coaches-1; Media-1)
 Chris Baker, Michigan State (Coaches-2; Media-2)

Defensive selections

Defensive linemen
 Courtney Brown, Penn State (Coaches-1; Media-1)
 Rob Renes, Michigan (Coaches-1; Media-1)
 Robaire Smith, Michigan State (Coaches-1; Media-1)
 Wendell Bryant, Wisconsin (Coaches-1; Media-2)
 Karon Riley, Minnesota (Coaches-2; Media-1)
 Dwayne Missouri, Northwestern (Coaches-2; Media-2)
 John Schlecht, Minnesota (Coaches-2; Media-2) 
 David Nugent, Purdue (Coaches-2)
 Adewale Ogunleye, Indiana (Coaches-2) 
 Akin Ayodele, Purdue (Media-2)

Linebackers
 LaVar Arrington, Penn State (Coaches-1; Media-1)
 Brandon Short, Penn State (Coaches-1; Media-1)
 Ian Gold, Michigan (Coaches-1; Media-2)
 Julian Peterson, Michigan State (Coaches-2; Media-1)
 Na'il Diggs, Ohio State (Coaches-2; Media-2)
 Dhani Jones, Michigan (Coaches-2)
 Kevin Bentley, Northwestern (Media-2)

Defensive backs
 Amp Campbell, Michigan State (Coaches-1; Media-1)
 Tyrone Carter, Minnesota (Coaches-1; Media-1)
 Jamar Fletcher, Wisconsin (Coaches-1; Media-1)
 Ahmed Plummer, Ohio State (Coaches-2; Media-1)
 Tommy Hendricks, Michigan (Coaches-1)
 David Macklin, Penn State (Coaches-2; Media-2)
 Aric Morris, Michigan State (Coaches-2; Media-2)
 Willie Middlebrooks, Minnesota (Coaches-2)
 Adrian Beasley, Purdue (Media-2)
 Matt Bowen, Iowa (Media-2)

Special teams

Kickers
 Vitaly Pisetsky, Wisconsin (Coaches-1; Media-1)
 Paul Edinger, Michigan State (Coaches-2; Media-2)

Punters
 Craig Jarrett, Michigan State (Coaches-1; Media-2)
 Drew Hagan, Indiana (Coaches-2; Media-1)

Key
Bold = selected as a first-team player by both the coaches and media panel

Coaches = selected by Big Ten Conference coaches

Media = selected by a media panel

See also
1999 College Football All-America Team

References

All-Big Ten Conference
All-Big Ten Conference football teams